An attitude object is the concept around which an attitude is formed and can change over time. This attitude represents an evaluative integration of both cognition and affect in relation to the attitude object.  An example of an attitude object is a product (e.g., a car). People can hold various beliefs about cars (cognitions, e.g., that a car is fast) as well as evaluations of those beliefs (affect, e.g., they might like or enjoy that the car is fast). Together these beliefs and affective evaluations of those beliefs represent an attitude toward the object.

See also  
 Attitude (psychology)

References 

Attitude change